The Lightning Express is a 1930 American pre-Code Universal film serial, featuring the adventures of "Whispering Smith" (played by Al Ferguson). This serial is considered a lost film.

The serial's story focuses on whether a railroad will be allowed to cross a family's property.

Cast
 Lane Chandler as Jack Venable
 Louise Lorraine as Bobbie
 Al Ferguson as detective Whispering Smith
 Greta Granstedt as Kate
 J. Gordon Russell as Frank Sayer, the villain
 John Oscar as Bill Lewellyn
 Martin Cichy as Hank
 Bob Reeves as Floyd Griswell
 James Pierce as henchman
 Robert Kelly as henchman

Production
The Lightning Express was based on "Whispering Smith Speaks" by Frank H. Spearman. Released by Universal on June 3, 1930, it was a remake of Whispering Smith Rides (1927).

Chapter titles
 A Shot in the Dark
 A Scream of Terror
 Dangerous Rails
 The Death Trap
 Tower of Terror
 A Call for Help
 The Runaway Freight
 The Showdown
 The Secret Survey
 Cleared Tracks
Source:

See also
 List of film serials by year
 List of film serials by studio

References

External links

1930 films
1930 Western (genre) films
American black-and-white films
1930s English-language films
Universal Pictures film serials
Films directed by Henry MacRae
American Western (genre) films
Lost Western (genre) films
Lost American films
1930 lost films
1930s American films